Fennel with lamb is a dish from the Aegean coast and Aegean Sea islands among both Turkish and Greek people.

See also

 List of lamb dishes

References

Greek cuisine
Turkish cuisine
Cretan cuisine
Lamb dishes